Dominic Gould (born 19 September 1964) is a French and American actor. He was born in Los Angeles, United States.

Filmography

Film 

 Jeux d'artifices (1987) - Stan
 Hôtel de France (1987) - Manu's Friend
 Monsieur (1990) - Monsieur
 The Man Who Lost His Shadow (L'Homme qui a perdu son ombre) (1991) - Paul
 Un homme et deux femmes (1991) - L'Américan
 Near Mrs. (1992) - Finch, Paris CIA Chief
 Wadeck's Mother's Friend's Son (1992) - Guy
 Iron Horsemen (1994) - Bad Trip
 Beaumarchais the Scoundrel (1996) - Arthur Lee
 The Eighth Day (1996) - le collègue de Harry
 Double Team (1997) - Delta Five
 Héroïnes (1997) - Jasper
 Alissa (1998) - Bodyguard
 A Soldier's Daughter Never Cries (1998) - Poker Player in Paris
 L.A. Without a Map (1998) - Music Store Clerk 1
 The Ice Rink (1998) - Head Key Grip
 The Deep (1999, Short) - Mahoney
 History Is Made at Night (1999) - CIA Agent
 Chili con carne (1999) - Burgerman Steve
 Les Cendres du paradis (2000) - Ivan
 Novo (2002) - Gilles
 Monique (2002) - Paul
 Embrassez qui vous voudrez (2002) - Parasol Man
 The Butterfly (2002) - Le hacker
 The Statement (2003) - Captain Durand
 Immortal (2004) - John (narration)
 L'Antidote (2005) - Andrew
 Marie-Antoinette (2006) - Count
 The Beautiful Person (2008) - Le prof d'Anglais
 Queen to Play (2009) - L'Américain
 Glen:The Flying Robot (2010) - Henry, Egotistical Pianist
 Paris Connections (2010) - Detective Morin
 The Prodigies (2011) - Kilian
 Capital (2012) - Oliver
 The Connection (2014) - John Cusack
 Beyond Metal (2016) - Henry
 Some Like It Veiled (2017) - Masseur aéroport
 À tout à l'heure (2017) - Troisième homme du rêve
 Chacun pour tous (2018) - Owen Gordon

 Television 
 L'Amoureuse (1987) - Dick
 The Great Escape II: The Untold Story (1988, TV Movie) - Jules
 The Maid (1990, TV Movie) - Pierre Meyer
 Charlemagne (1993, TV Mini-Series) - Oger
 Rêveuse jeunesse (1994, TV Movie) - British Pilot
 Souhaitez-moi bonne chance (1997, TV Movie) - François
 It's Not About Love (1998, TV Movie) - Bernard
 Jalousie (2001, TV Movie) - Bob
 Commissariat Bastille (2002) - Leroy
 Largo Winch (2002) - Nick
 Close to Leo (2002, TV Movie) - Father
 Le Secret de la belle de Mai, Le (2002, TV Movie) - Klein
 Les Cordier, juge et flic (2002) - Maxime Modier
 La Faux (2003, TV Movie) - Jenkins
 Les Enfants du miracle (2003, TV Movie) - Robert
 Petits mythes urbains (2004) - The Taxi Passenger
 Le Grand Charles (2006, TV Movie) - Roosevelt's interpreter

 Video games 
 Beyond: Two Souls (2013) - Paul / Earl / Mike
 Detroit: Become Human'' (2018) - Todd Williams

References

External links
Profile at UniFrance

1964 births
Living people
French male film actors
French male television actors